Bemm River is a township and locality in the East Gippsland region of Victoria, Australia. At the 2016 census, Bemm River and the surrounding area had a population of 60.

Location and features
The locality surrounds Sydenham Inlet and much of its area to the north is state forest, while Cape Conran Coastal Park adjoins the western shores of the inlet and Croajingolong National Park adjoins its eastern shores.

The area is renowned for its bream fishing, which gives it its second name, 'The Bream Capital'. There are several tourist accommodation places in the town. There is a general store and a pub which is also a licensed restaurant. There is also a Local Radio Station that Broadcasts during the Victorian School Holidays on the FM Frequency 90.9BRFM. Bemm River Local Radio(www.bemmriverlocalradio.com)

The Post Office opened on 1 July 1911 closed in 1920, reopened in 1933, then closed again in 1982.

Sydenham Inlet
Bemm River township is situated on the north-western shore of Sydenham Inlet, a natural coastal inlet that stretches over to the sand hills of the Tasman Sea shoreline of the South Pacific Ocean. The inlet is fed by the Bemm River in the west and the Little River in the east.

References

Coastal towns in Victoria (Australia)
Croajingolong National Park
Towns in Victoria (Australia)
Shire of East Gippsland